Rheda Djellal (born 2 January 1991 in Etterbeek) is a Belgian football player of Algerian descent, who plays for Racing Mechelen.

Career
Born in Etterbeek, Brussels, Djellal began playing for Anderlecht at age 14.

On 31 August 2011 Djellal was loaned out by Anderlecht to Eredivisie side SBV Excelsior until the end of the season. On 11 September 2011 Djellal made his official debut for Excelsior as a 58th-minute substitute in a league match against Utrecht.

References

External links
 
 

1991 births
Living people
People from Etterbeek
Belgian expatriate sportspeople in the Netherlands
Belgian footballers
Belgian people of Algerian descent
Belgian expatriate footballers
Eredivisie players
Excelsior Rotterdam players
R.S.C. Anderlecht players
Expatriate footballers in the Netherlands
Association football forwards
Footballers from Brussels